The Collection is a compilation box set by American singer and recording artist Michael Jackson released four days after his death, though its release was already scheduled before Jackson's passing. With the exception of HIStory, it contains all of Jackson's Epic studio albums. It has peaked at number one in several countries.

This set was originally available, albeit in different packaging, in 2001 as a very rare UK promo set to celebrate the release of Invincible at 34 Westferry Circus in Canary Wharf, London. This compilation also marks the beginning of Jackson's posthumous legacy. The artwork scheme is similar to the King of Pop UK edition album.

Chart performance
The album spent two weeks atop the European Top 100 Albums chart.

Track listing

Off the Wall (2001 Special Edition)

Thriller

Bad (2001 Special Edition)

Dangerous (2001 Special Edition)

Invincible

Charts

Weekly charts

Year-end charts

Certifications and sales

References

2009 compilation albums
Michael Jackson compilation albums
Albums produced by Michael Jackson
Epic Records compilation albums
Compilation albums published posthumously